In philosophy, praxeology or praxiology is the theory of human action, based on the notion that humans engage in purposeful behavior, contrary to reflexive behavior and other unintentional behavior.

French social philosopher Alfred Espinas gave the term its modern meaning, and praxeology was developed independently by two principal groups: the Austrian school, led by Ludwig von Mises, and the Polish school, led by Tadeusz Kotarbiński.

Origin and etymology
Coinage of the word praxeology (praxéologie) is often credited to Louis Bourdeau, the French author of a classification of the sciences, which he published in his Théorie des sciences: Plan de Science intégrale in 1882:

However, the term was used at least once previously (with a slight spelling difference), in 1608, by Clemens Timpler in his Philosophiae practicae systema methodicum:

It was later mentioned by Robert Flint in 1904 in a review of Bourdeau's Théorie des sciences.

The modern definition of the word was first given by Alfred V. Espinas (1844–1922), the French philosopher and sociologist; he was the forerunner of the Polish school of the science of efficient action. The Austrian school of economics was based on a philosophical science of the same kind.

With a different spelling, the word was used by the English psychologist Charles Arthur Mercier (in 1911), and proposed by Knight Dunlap to John B. Watson as a better name for his behaviorism. Watson rejected it. But the Chinese physiologist of behavior, Zing-Yang Kuo (b. 1898) adopted the term in 1935. It was also used by William McDougall (in 1928 and later).

Previously the word praxiology, with the meaning Espinas gave to it, was used by Tadeusz Kotarbiński (in 1923). Several economists, such as the Ukrainian, Eugene Slutsky (1926) used it in his attempt to base economics on a theory of action. It was also used by Austrian economist Ludwig von Mises (1933), Russian Marxist Nikolai Bukharin (1888–1938) during the Second International Congress of History of Science and Technology in London (in 1931), and Polish scholar Oscar Lange (1904–1965) in 1959, and later.

The Italian philosopher, Carmelo Ottaviano, was using the Italianised version, prassiologia, in his treatises starting from 1935, but in his own way, as a theory of politics. After the Second World War the use of the term praxeology spread widely. After the emigration of Mises to the US his pupil Murray Rothbard defended the praxeological approach. A revival of Espinas's approach in France was revealed in the works of Pierre Massé (1946), the eminent cybernetician, Georges Théodule Guilbaud (1953), the Belgian logician, Leo Apostel (1957), the cybernetician, Anatol Rapoport (1962), Henry Pierron, psychologist and lexicographer (1957), François Perroux, economist (1957), the social psychologist, Robert Daval (1963), the well-known sociologist, Raymond Aron (1963) and the methodologists, Abraham Antoine Moles and Roland Caude (1965).

Under the influence of Tadeusz Kotarbiński, praxeology flourished in Poland. A special "Centre of Praxeology" (Zaklad Prakseologiczny) was created under the organizational guidance of the Polish Academy of Sciences, with its own periodical (from 1962), called at first Materiały Prakseologiczne (Praxeological Papers), and then abbreviated to Prakseologia. It published hundreds of papers by different authors, and the materials for a special vocabulary edited by Professor Tadeusz Pszczolowski, the leading praxeologist of the younger generation. A sweeping survey of the praxeological approach is to be found in the paper by the French statistician Micheline Petruszewycz, "A propos de la praxéologie".

Ludwig von Mises was influenced by several theories in forming his work on praxeology, including Immanuel Kant's works, Max Weber's work on methodological individualism, and Carl Menger's development of the subjective theory of value.

Philosopher of science Mario Bunge published works of systematic philosophy that included contributions to praxeology.

Austrian economics

Austrian economics in the tradition of Ludwig von Mises relies heavily on praxeology in the development of its economic theories. Mises considered economics to be a sub-discipline of praxeology. Austrian School economists, following Mises, use praxeology and deduction, rather than empirical studies, to determine economic principles. According to these theorists, with the action axiom as the starting point, it is possible to draw conclusions about human behavior that are both objective and universal. For example, the notion that humans engage in acts of choice implies that they have preferences, and this must be true for anyone who exhibits intentional behavior.

Advocates of praxeology also say that it provides insights for the field of ethics.

Subdivisions
In 1951, Murray Rothbard divided the subfields of praxeology as follows:
 A. The Theory of the Isolated Individual (Crusoe Economics)
 B. The Theory of Voluntary Interpersonal Exchange (Catallactics, or the Economics of the Market)
 1. Barter
 2. With Medium of Exchange
 a. On the Unhampered Market
 b. Effects of Violent Intervention with the Market
 c. Effects of Violent Abolition of the Market (Socialism)
 C. The Theory of War – Hostile Action
 D. The Theory of Games (Game Theory) (e.g., von Neumann and Morgenstern)
 E. Unknown
At the time, topics C, D, and E were regarded by Rothbard as open research problems.

Criticisms
Thomas Mayer has argued that, because praxeology rejects positivism and empiricism in the development of theories, it constitutes nothing less than a rejection of the scientific method. For Mayer, this invalidates the methodologies of the Austrian school of economics. Austrians argue that empirical data itself is insufficient to describe economics; that consequently empirical data cannot falsify economic theory; that logical positivism cannot predict or explain human action; and that the methodological requirements of logical positivism are impossible to obtain for economic questions. Ludwig von Mises in particular argued against empiricist approaches to the social sciences in general, because human events are unique and non-repeatable, whereas experiments in the physical sciences are necessarily reproducible.

However, economist Antony Davies argues that because statistical tests are predicated on the independent development of theory, some form of praxeology is essential for model selection; conversely, praxeology can illustrate surprising philosophical consequences of economic models.

Argentine-Canadian philosopher Mario Bunge dismissed von Mises's version of praxeology as "nothing but the principle of maximization of subjective utility—a fancy version of egoism". Bunge, who was also a fierce critic of pseudoscience, warned that when "conceived in extremely general terms and detached from both ethics and science, praxiology has hardly any practical value".

See also

 Action theory (philosophy)
 Action theory (sociology)
 Behavioral economics
 Decision theory
 Methodological individualism
 Philosophy of economics
 Philosophy of social science
 Rationalism
 Thymology

References

Further reading

Austrian school

Polish school
 Gasparski, Wojciech W. (1992–). Praxiology: The International Annual of Practical Philosophy and Methodology. New Brunswick, NJ: Transaction Publishers. 
 

Austrian School
Social philosophy
Epistemology
1882 introductions
Social sciences
Academic disciplines